The 2005 Pavel Roman Memorial was the 11th edition of an annual international ice dancing competition held in Olomouc, Czech Republic. The event was held between November 18 and 20, 2005. Ice dancers competed in the senior, junior, and novice levels.

Results

Senior

External links
 results

Pavel Roman Memorial, 2005
Pavel Roman Memorial